NK Hrvace is a Croatian football club based in the town of Hrvace. They currently compete in Treća HNL, Croatia's third level.

Honours 

 Treća HNL – South:
Winners (1): 2007–08

Current squad

External links 
NK Hrvace at Nogometni magazin 

Football clubs in Croatia
Football clubs in Split-Dalmatia County
Association football clubs established in 1997
1997 establishments in Croatia